Iraqis in Finland are people with Iraqi background residing in Finland. As of 31 December 2021, they numbered 26,653, making them the fourth largest immigrant group in Finland behind Russians, Estonians and Swedes.

Migration
Most Iraqis in Finland have come as refugees. Of the 32,000 people who sought asylum in Finland in 2015, 21,000 were Iraqis, or two-thirds of all asylum seekers.

Asylum based on clan feuds 
Iraq is a clan-based society like many in the Middle East. Many Iraqis claim asylum in Finland on the basis that they are threatened by rival clans in their home country, but the refugee conventions state that asylum is granted on the basis of being persecuted by authorities of a country. Persecution by other civilians is primarily a concern of police in the country of origin. This creates contradictions because officials in Iraqi police authorities might themselves be members of a rival clan.

Distribution
Helsinki is home to the largest Iraqi community, but Turku has the highest proportion.

Crime

Rape
In 2017, 12% of suspects found guilty of solved rapes reported in Finland were Iraqis. Iraqis were also found to be perpetrators in 199 sexual offences.

Honor crime

The first case of an honor killing in Finland happened in 2015, when a 20 year old Iraqi man was sentenced to unconditional imprisonment for planning to murder his 16-year-old sister. He was also sentenced for assault. He and their mother had forbidden his sister from meeting people her own age and leaving the home beyond going to school.

In 2019, a 48-year-old Iraqi attempted to murder his 40-year-old ex-wife because she associated with other men. The stabbing was done at an educational institution where both were studying. When she turned around, he stabbed her in the back. She was seriously wounded but survived. 
The couple had arrived in Finland in 2015 and divorced shortly after arriving.

Notable Finnish people of Iraqi descent

References

Ethnic groups in Finland
 
Finland